Howard Nathan Jr. (January 21, 1972 – July 28, 2019) was an American professional basketball player. Born in Peoria, Illinois, Nathan attended DePaul University, Northeast Louisiana University (now University of Louisiana at Monroe) and Northwest Arkansas Community College. He played 5 games during the 1995–96 NBA season with the Atlanta Hawks, averaging 2.6 points and 0.4 assists per game.

Nathan appears in the 1994 documentary film Hoop Dreams as an adversary of Arthur Agee's John Marshall Metropolitan High School Commandos in the 1991 Illinois high school basketball championship tournament. Nathan's Manual High School (Peoria) ultimately won the game. Nathan was named Mr. Basketball of Illinois in 1991.

Nathan was paralyzed after an allegedly drunk driver drove into his Oldsmobile in Peoria on July 30, 2006. He died at the age of 47 in a Peoria hospital on July 28, 2019.

References

External links 
 NBA stats @ basketballreference.com

1972 births
2019 deaths
African-American basketball players
American men's basketball players
Atlanta Hawks players
Basketball players from Illinois
DePaul Blue Demons men's basketball players
Junior college men's basketball players in the United States
Louisiana–Monroe Warhawks men's basketball players
McDonald's High School All-Americans
Northwest Arkansas Community College alumni
Omaha Racers players
Parade High School All-Americans (boys' basketball)
People with paraplegia
Point guards
Road incident deaths in Illinois
Rockford Lightning players
Sportspeople from Peoria, Illinois
Undrafted National Basketball Association players